

India

 Jana Mani ஜன மணி
 Dina Thanthi தினத்தந்தி
 Dinakaran தினகரன்
 Murasoli முரசொலி
 Dinamalar தினமலர்
 Tamil Anjal தமிழ் அஞ்சல் 
 Dinamani தினமணி (Tamil Branch of The Indian Express)
 Dinavidiyal தினவிடியல்
 Dinasudar
 Theekkathir
  Hindu Tamil Thisai இந்து தமிழ் திசை
 Viduthalai
 Times Of Tamil
 VanakkamIndia News வணக்கம் இந்தியா நாளிதழ் 
 "புது வியூகம் தமிழ் வார இதழ்
 Namathu Puratchi Thalaivi Amma
  Arunai Express 
(Kani Malar)
 Nixs News Tamil Nixs News தமிழ் 
  Makkal Ullatchi Kural  மக்கள் உள்ளாட்சி குரல் 
 Kathiravan
 பூலோகம்

Evening Newspapers 

 Maalai Malar மாலை மலர்
 Malai Murasu மாலை முரசு
 Tamil Murasu தமிழ் முரசு (India) - Evening Daily
 Nellai Maalai Murasu நெல்லை மாலை முரசு

Sri Lanka

Virakesari வீரகேசரி
Thinakaran
Thinakkural
Uthayan
Sudar Oli
Tamil Mirror
IBC Tamil
TamilWin
TBN Sri Lanka Media

Malaysia

Makkal Osai 
Malaysia Nanban 
Tamil Nesan 
Tamil Malar

Singapore
Tamil Murasu (தமிழ் முரசு)

Canada 

Uthayan (Canada உதயன்)
The Tamil Journal (The Tamil Journal  தமிழ் இதழ்)
The Ceylon Times (The First Tamil English bilingual newspaper of the world est: Dec 2001. Now operating as theceylontimes website)

References

 Read all Tamil Newspapers in India
 All Tamil newspapers

 
Tamil